Ken Nkuba Tshiend (born 21 January 2002) is a Belgian professional footballer who plays as a forward for the club Charleroi.

Club career
On 26 October 2018, Nkuba signed his first professional contract with Charleroi at the age of 16. Nkuba made his professional debut with Charleroi on the same day, in a 2-1 Belgian First Division A loss to K.A.A. Gent.

International career
Born in Belgium, Nkuba is of Congolese descent. He is a youth international for Belgium.

References

External links
 
 

2002 births
Living people
Belgian footballers
Belgium youth international footballers
Belgian people of Democratic Republic of the Congo descent
R. Charleroi S.C. players
Belgian Pro League players
Association football forwards
Black Belgian sportspeople